Jiangsu Art Gallery, usually known as Jiangsu Provincial Art Museum, is a museum in Nanjing, in Jiangsu province in China. It was founded in 1936, during the Nanjing decade, as China's first state level museum. In 1960, it was formally renamed as the Jiangsu Provincial Art Museum. In 2010 it re-opened in a new  building designed by the German architect studio KSP Jürgen Engel Architekten.

The museum hosts the Nanjing biennale.

The gallery is the largest in the Jiangsu Province, presenting traditional and contemporary art pieces of China.

Transportation
The building is accessible within walking distance east of Daxinggong Station of Nanjing Metro.

See also
 List of tourist attractions in China
 Nanjing Great Hall of the People

References

Contemporary art galleries in China
Museums in Nanjing
Culture in Jiangsu
Art museums established in 1936
1936 establishments in China
Art museums and galleries in China
Art galleries established in 1936